Tárkány is a village in Komárom-Esztergom county, Hungary.

Tárkány has 1444 inhabitants (2015). The place had several settlement such as Major, Mihályháza, Ölbő, Parragh and Vasdinnye-puszta.

The Roman Catholic Church was built in 1734 and the Reformed Church in 1800.

External links
 Street map (Hungarian)

Populated places in Komárom-Esztergom County